Limebreach Wood (sometimes written as Lime Breach Wood) is a woodland on the south side of the Tickenham Ridge, between Clevedon and Bristol. It is very close to the site of Cadbury Camp.

It is an ancient woodland, with a high proportion of Small-leaved Lime trees. The mushroom-forming fungi Limacella ochraceolutea is found in the wood.

Part of the wood is managed as a nature reserve by Avon Wildlife Trust.

The pyralid moth Salebriopsis albicilla occurs here.

References

 Wildgoose, Simon, Paul Bradley and Martin Boustead (undated), Nature Reserves Guide, Avon Wildlife Trust

Nature reserves in Somerset
Forests and woodlands of Somerset
North Somerset